The Córas Iompair Éireann 601 Class locomotives were built in 1956-1957, by Motorenfabrik Deutz at Cologne, Germany. They were 3 small shunting locomotives (601, 602 & 603) of B wheel arrangement and were fitted with a Deutz V8 F8L 614 engine of 130 hp, with Voith hydraulic transmission and chain final drive. These locomotives were never fitted with train brakes, so had limited usefulness compared to their successors, the G611 class. The G601 locomotives were withdrawn from service between 1965 and 1972.

Preservation
One of these locomotives, number G601, has been preserved by the Irish Traction Group and is currently awaiting restoration at Carrick-on-Suir. In 2010 a secondhand engine was purchased to replace the seized engine currently fitted.

Model 
The 601 Class has been made as a 4 mm scale brass kit by Worsley Works.   Steve Johnson's site also has details on kitbashing a model.

References

External links
 Irish Traction Group webpage for preserved G601

Iarnród Éireann locomotives
Deutz locomotives
B locomotives
5 ft 3 in gauge locomotives
Diesel locomotives of Ireland
Railway locomotives introduced in 1956